Perfection, originally produced by the Pennsylvania company Reed Toys, is a game by the Milton Bradley company. The object is to put all the pieces into matching holes on the board (pushed down) before the time limit runs out. When time runs out, the board springs up, causing many, if not all, of the pieces to fly out. In the most common version, there are 25 pieces to be placed into a 5×5 grid within 60 seconds.

History 
The original Perfection game was patented by the Harmonic Reed Company (later Reed Toys) in 1973.  The patent was later transferred to Lakeside Industries who, several years later, was purchased by Coleco in 1986. When Coleco went bankrupt in 1988 the remaining assets and IPs were purchased by Hasbro in 1989, who continues to manufacture the game under their Milton Bradley brand.

Gameplay 
In the original version, one player at a time attempts to fit all 25 shapes into the holes in the game tray. The shapes are mixed and placed next to the game unit with handles facing up, the pop-up tray is pushed down, and the timer dial is set to 60 seconds. After moving the switch to START, the timer begins to run and the player must fit the shapes into their holes as quickly as possible. If the player completes this task, he/she moves the switch to STOP and records the time taken. If time runs out, the tray pops up and scatters the pieces in all directions. The winner is the player who fills the tray in the shortest time.

Original 1973 version 
The original Perfection game consists of a red and yellow board with 25 shapes.  Its "pop-up" mechanism was an ejector plate situated under the shaped holes and lowered by a PUSH button.  The board also included a scoreboard with four stackable pegs of different colors.  One point was scored for each shape properly placed in their correct holes; if all 25 shapes were inserted before the allotted 60 seconds, one point was also scored for each remaining second left on the clock.  For tie scores, pegs were stacked on top of one another.

The original version also included red "block-out" squares that were used one of two ways.  For beginners and younger players, a chosen number of holes were covered and their corresponding shapes were removed.   For advanced players, a chosen number of holes were covered, but all shapes were kept in play.

In 1975, the game was changed to its current "pop-up tray" format in which the scoreboard and pegs, red block-out squares and four-point star shape were removed.

Game variants 
Superfection (1975): In this advanced version of Perfection, the object is to assemble 16 two-piece puzzle cubes and place them in the tray within two minutes. 
Challenge Perfection (1978): Two to four players play against each other to be the first to fill their base of 18 shapes first.  However, the bases are different so that one player could take a piece needed by another player.  This version does not feature the pop-up mechanism.
Head-To-Head Perfection (1987): Two players compete to insert 25 shapes (in a format similar to Superfection) in their pop-up tray first and in the shortest time.  Each player has a pop-up bar in front of their base; whoever completes their board first presses the bar to pop-up the opponent's tray and scatter the pieces.

Rereleases 
In 1992, the game was relaunched with a new jingle for television advertisements, "Pop Goes Perfection", to the tune of "Pop Goes the Weasel".

In 1996, the game gained a new look, and was advertised on Nickelodeon, then on YTV.

International distribution

References

External links 
 
 Perfection at TV Cream

Board games introduced in 1973
Children's board games
Milton Bradley Company games